This is a list of universities in Burkina Faso.

Universities in Burkina Faso

Institut Supérieur d’Informatique et de Gestion
L'Université Aube Nouvelle
L'Université du Faso
Nazi Boni University
 Burkina Institute of Technology 
Université Saint Thomas d'Aquin (USTA), Ouagadougou; catholic
University of Koudougou
University of Ouagadougou

References

Universities and colleges in Burkina Faso
Burkina Faso
Universities
Burkina Faso